The Jasola Vihar Shaheen Bagh metro station is located on the Magenta Line of the Delhi Metro. Jasola Vihar Shaheen Bagh is part of Phase III of Delhi Metro on the Magenta Line.Jasola Vihar Shaheen Bagh metro station was opened on 25 December 2017

History

Construction

The station

Structure
Jasola Vihar Shaheen Bagh is elevated metro station situated on the Magenta Line of Delhi Metro.

Station layout

Facilities
List of available ATM at Jasola Vihar Shaheen Bagh metro station are,

Connections

Bus

Entry/Exit

See also

Delhi
List of Delhi Metro stations
Transport in Delhi
Delhi Metro Rail Corporation
Delhi Suburban Railway
Delhi Monorail
Delhi Transport Corporation
Noida
Okhla Sanctuary
Okhla barrage
Kalindi Kunj
National Capital Region (India)
List of rapid transit systems
List of metro systems

References

External links

 Delhi Metro Rail Corporation Ltd. - official site
 Delhi Metro Annual Reports
 
 UrbanRail.Net – descriptions of all metro systems in the world, each with a schematic map showing all stations.

 Routes from Jasola Vihar Shaheen Bagh Metro Station

Delhi Metro stations
Railway stations in India opened in 2017
Railway stations in South East Delhi district